5M or 5-M may refer to:

 5M model, a troubleshooting and risk-management model used for aviation safety
 Sibaviatrans (IATA code), a former airline
 5M, a Toyota M engine
 5M, a model of HP LaserJet 5
 Shada (Doctor Who) (production code: 5M), an unfinished Doctor Who serial

See also
 M5 (disambiguation)